Nabor Ochoa López (born 12 July 1960) is a Mexican politician affiliated with the Ecologist Green Party of Mexico (PVEM). He served as Deputy of the LX and LXII Legislatures of the Mexican Congress representing Colima. He had been a member of the National Action Party and of the Institutional Revolutionary Party.

References

1960 births
Living people
Politicians from Guerrero
Institutional Revolutionary Party politicians
Ecologist Green Party of Mexico politicians
National Action Party (Mexico) politicians
21st-century Mexican politicians
Deputies of the LXII Legislature of Mexico
Members of the Chamber of Deputies (Mexico) for Colima